Vinogradov's jird (Meriones vinogradovi)  is a species of rodent in the family Muridae. It is found in Armenia, Azerbaijan, Iran, Syria, and Turkey.

See also
 Vinogradov's jerboa

References

Meriones (rodent)
Mammals of Azerbaijan
Jird, Vinogradov's
Mammals described in 1931
Taxonomy articles created by Polbot